On 19 September 2019, a suicide car bombing occurred outside a hospital in Qalati Ghilji, Zabul Province, Afghanistan. At least 20 people were estimated to be killed and over 90 others injured. By 20 September the death toll had risen to 39, with most of the victims being doctors and patients. More than 140 people were also injured in the attack, although the true number is believed to be higher. The Taliban later claimed that they meant to bomb the National Directorate of Security, a governmental intelligence building next door to the hospital, but were unable to park there so they ended up parking in front of the hospital instead. Governor Rahmatullah Yarmal later said that the hospital had been destroyed. The hospital was the main health facility in Zabul Province before the bombing.

References 

2019 murders in Afghanistan
21st century in Zabul Province
21st-century mass murder in Afghanistan
Attacks on buildings and structures in 2019
Attacks on buildings and structures in Afghanistan
Attacks on hospitals 

Islamic terrorism in Afghanistan
Islamic terrorist incidents in 2019
Mass murder in 2019
September 2019 crimes in Asia
September 2019 events in Afghanistan
Suicide bombings in 2019
Suicide car and truck bombings in Afghanistan
Taliban bombings
Terrorist incidents in Afghanistan in 2019
Building bombings in Afghanistan
Attacks in Afghanistan in 2019